Damir Grgić (born May 18, 1992) is a Croatian footballer currently playing as a defender for TuS Koblenz in the German fifth tier-Oberliga.

Club career
He had spells in the NOFV Oberliga with Malchower SV and in Austria with four different teams. He joined TuS Koblenz in summer 2022 after stints in the top flights of Slovenia, India, Croatia and Albania.

References

External links
 
 

1992 births
Living people
People from Gladbeck
Sportspeople from Münster (region)
Footballers from North Rhine-Westphalia
Association football central defenders
Croatian footballers
SK Austria Klagenfurt players
Malchower SV players
NK Rudar Velenje players
FC Pune City players
NK Aluminij players
NK Inter Zaprešić players
KS Kastrioti players
TuS Koblenz players
Austrian Regionalliga players
NOFV-Oberliga players
Slovenian PrvaLiga players
Indian Super League players
Croatian Football League players
First Football League (Croatia) players
Kategoria Superiore players
Croatian expatriate footballers
Expatriate footballers in Austria
Croatian expatriate sportspeople in Austria
Expatriate footballers in India
Croatian expatriate sportspeople in India
Expatriate footballers in Slovenia
Croatian expatriate sportspeople in Slovenia
Expatriate footballers in Albania
Croatian expatriate sportspeople in Albania